Leonidas is a city in Saint Louis County, Minnesota, United States. The population was 52 at the 2010 census.

Kane Road (Saint Louis County Road 101) serves as a main route in Leonidas.  Other routes include 13th Avenue West.

The city of Leonidas is located immediately west of the city of Eveleth.

Geography

Demographics

2010 census
As of the census of 2010, there were 52 people, 24 households, and 13 families living in the city. The racial makeup of the city was 96.2% White, 1.9% Native American, and 1.9% from two or more races.

There were 24 households, of which 25.0% had children under the age of 18 living with them, 50.0% were married couples living together, 4.2% had a female householder with no husband present, and 45.8% were non-families. 37.5% of all households were made up of individuals, and 8.3% had someone living alone who was 65 years of age or older. The average household size was 2.17 and the average family size was 2.92.

The median age in the city was 46.5 years. 21.2% of residents were under the age of 18; 3.7% were between the ages of 18 and 24; 23% were from 25 to 44; 40.3% were from 45 to 64; and 11.5% were 65 years of age or older. The gender makeup of the city was 48.1% male and 51.9% female.

2000 census
As of the census of 2000, there were 60 people, 26 households, and 19 families living in the city. There were 27 housing units at an average density of 20.3 per square mile (7.8/km2). The racial makeup of the city was 98.33% White, and 1.67% from two or more races. 55.9% were of Swedish, 17.6% German and 11.8% Finnish ancestry.

There were 26 households, out of which 34.6% had children under the age of 18 living with them, 57.7% were married couples living together, 3.8% had a female householder with no husband present, and 26.9% were non-families. 15.4% of all households were made up of individuals, and 7.7% had someone living alone who was 65 years of age or older. The average household size was 2.31 and the average family size was 2.58.

In the city, the population was spread out, with 23.3% under the age of 18, 10.0% from 18 to 24, 23.3% from 25 to 44, 30.0% from 45 to 64, and 13.3% who were 65 years of age or older. The median age was 42 years. For every 100 females, there were 100.0 males. For every 100 females age 18 and over, there were 100.0 males.

The median income for a household in the city was $19,167, and the median income for a family was $19,583. Males had a median income of $31,250 versus $40,000 for females. The per capita income for the city was $15,023. There were 20.0% of families and 14.3% of the population living below the poverty line, including 10.0% of under eighteens and 14.3% of those over 64.

References

Cities in Minnesota
Cities in St. Louis County, Minnesota
Mining communities in Minnesota